= South West Africa (disambiguation) =

South West Africa is the former name of Namibia. It may refer to:

- German South West Africa (1884–1915), under German control
- South West Africa (1915–1990), under South African control
